Only on the Left Side is the tenth solo studio album by American rapper Daz Dillinger. It was released on August 12, 2008, through D.P.G. Recordz/Fontana Distribution, while had been initially scheduled for an April or May release. Production was handled by Ivan Johnson, Soopafly, Lil' Ronnie, Salam Wreck, Swizz Beatz, and Daz himself, who also served as executive producer. It features guest appearances from Keak da Sneak, Krayzie Bone, Kurupt, Manish Man, Nicole Wray, Obie Trice, Snoop Dogg, Soopafly, Swizz Beatz, Tyrese and Big Von. The album peaked at number 38 on the Top R&B/Hip-Hop Albums, number 17 on the Top Rap Albums and number 46 on the Independent Albums charts in the United States with 2,132 copies sold in its first week. It was preceded by the only single "Dip Drop Stop Dip".

Track listing

Personnel
Delmar "Daz Dillinger" Arnaud – main artist, producer (tracks: 1, 3–7, 9, 11–15), executive producer
Kasseem "Swizz Beatz" Dean – featured artist & producer (track 2)
Anthony "Krayzie Bone" Henderson – featured artist (track 5)
"Big Von" Johnson – featured artist (track 8)
Charles "Keak da Sneak" Williams – featured artist (track 9)
Albert Lee "Manish Man" Harris – featured artist (track 10)
Priest "Soopafly" Brooks – featured artist (track 12), producer (tracks: 10–12)
Calvin "Snoop Dogg" Broadus – featured artist (track 13)
Tyrese Gibson – featured artist (track 14)
Nicole Wray – featured artist (track 14)
Obie Trice – featured artist (track 16)
Ricardo "Kurupt" Brown – featured artist (track 17)
Ivan L. Johnson – producer (tracks: 1, 3–7, 9, 13–15)
Salam Nassar – producer (track 16)
"Lil' Ronnie" Jackson – producer (track 17)
Young Breezy – cover design
Arnold "Bigg A" White – marketing & promotion

Charts

References

2008 albums
Daz Dillinger albums
D.P.G. Recordz albums
Albums produced by Soopafly
Albums produced by Swizz Beatz
Albums produced by Daz Dillinger